Arthur Knight may refer to:

Arthur Knight (bishop) (1864–1939), third Bishop of Rangoon
Arthur Knight (film critic) (1916–1991), movie critic, film historian, professor and TV host
Arthur Knight (rugby union) (1906–1990), New Zealand rugby union player
Arthur Knight (footballer) (1887–1956), English Olympic football player and cricketer
Arthur George Knight (1886–1918), Canadian recipient of the Victoria Cross
Arthur Gerald Knight (1895–1916), Canadian World War I fighter ace
Arthur Rex Knight (1903–1963), Australia-born psychologist
Arthur F. Knight (1865–1936), American inventor credited with invention of steel golf clubs
Arthur Knight (businessman) (1917–2003), British businessman
Arthur Knight, an alias of Nicholas Alahverdian, American convicted sex offender